Newcastle is a community within the Town of Drumheller, Alberta, Canada. It held village status for eight years between 1923 and 1931, and was recognized as a hamlet prior to annexation by Drumheller in 1967. The former hamlet of Midlandvale is located across the river to the north.

History 
Newcastle was incorporated as a village on March 16, 1923.  It subsequently dissolved from village status on May 21, 1931. Newcastle was eventually annexed by the former City of Drumheller from the former Municipal District of Badlands No. 7 (then Improvement District No. 7) in 1967.

Demographics 

Over the course of its incorporation, Newcastle had a population of 281 and 304 in 1926 and 1931 respectively. Despite its dissolution in 1931, the former village grew to a population of 1,278 in 1936 and peaked at a population of 1,317 in 1951. It then declined to a population of 949 in 1961.

See also 
List of communities in Alberta
List of former urban municipalities in Alberta

References 

Drumheller
Former hamlets in Alberta
Former villages in Alberta
Populated places disestablished in 1967